Stephen P. Heymann is an attorney who formerly served as an Assistant U.S. Attorney for the District of Massachusetts. He is no longer with the U.S. Attorney's office. He headed U.S. Attorney Carmen Ortiz's Internet and Computer Crimes Unit. Heymann is best known for his role in the United States v. Swartz federal criminal case which led to the eventual suicide of Aaron Swartz.

Personal 
Heymann is the son of former United States Deputy Attorney General Philip Heymann, with whom Ortiz worked on judicial reform in Guatemala.

According to the National Law Journal, "Heymann has long been recognized as a national expert in electronic crimes, prosecuting cutting-edge cases."

Career 
Heymann was a career federal prosecutor.

He was formerly a Special Attorney with the U.S. Department of Justice's Organized Crime Strike Force, Deputy Chief of the Criminal Division of the Massachusetts U.S. Attorney's Office. He headed that office's Internet and Computer Crimes Unit, one of the first offices of its kind in the U.S.

NASA computer hack
In 1995-1996, Heymann supported lead prosecutor Jacqueline E. Ross and worked with investigators in the lead-up to the arrest, prosecution and conviction of Julio César "Griton" Ardita, an Argentine man accused of hacking into NASA and Department of Defense computers. The court-ordered wiretap that made it possible to identify and prosecute Ardita was the first of its kind.

From his apartment in Buenos Aires, Ardita accessed a computer network at Harvard. He stole passwords as Harvard users accessed other networks. By the time he was caught, Ardita had hacked into the U.S. Department of Defense, NASA's Jet Propulsion Laboratory, NASA Ames Research Center, the Naval Research Laboratory, and the Naval Command Control and Ocean Surveillance Center.

Heymann said investigators worked with Harvard so they could track an intruder without violating users' privacy. He said the compromised Harvard network comprised 16,500 accounts and 13,000 users, sending out about 60,000 email messages daily. Investigators, he explained used a high-speed computer to sift through messages, focusing on 10 to 15 keywords that matched the suspect's profile. According to Heymann, investigators believed there were only two instances in which they had read a complete message that did not come from Ardita.

In a press release after the warrant for Ardita's arrest was announced, Attorney General Janet Reno said, "This case demonstrates that the real threat to computer privacy comes from unscrupulous intruders, not government investigators", going on to praise the creation of procedures that focused on the intruder's unlawful activities. "This is doing it the right way," she said. "We are using a traditional court order and new technology to defeat a criminal, while protecting individual rights and Constitutional principles that are important to all Americans." At her weekly press conference, she elaborated: "This is an example of how the Fourth Amendment and a court order can be used to protect rights while adapting to modern technology."

The case was complicated by the fact that Ardita resided in Argentina, where the charged felonies were not extraditable offenses. Two years after the warrant issued, Ardita voluntarily traveled to the U.S., pleaded guilty, and was sentenced to three years probation and a fine of $5,000.

TJX identity theft
Heymann led the investigation of computer hacker Albert Gonzalez-associates Jonathan James, Stephen Watt and Damon Toey for  computer intrusion and identity theft from the TJX Companies and from retailers like BJ's, DSW, OfficeMax, Boston Market, Barnes & Noble, Sports Authority  and Forever 21.

Watt and Toey were convicted. James, an alleged "unindicted co-conspirator," was never prosecuted in the case, having committed suicide two weeks after the U.S. Secret Service raided his house. Gonzalez was never charged in the TJX case.

Heartland Payment Systems
Heymann was instrumental in successfully prosecuting Gonzalez for the theft of data from 130 million transactions at Heartland Payment Systems. He was honored with the Attorney General's Distinguished Service Award by Attorney General Eric Holder for his work on "the largest and most successful identity theft and hacking investigation and prosecution ever conducted in the United States."

Aaron Swartz

Heymann's conduct in the prosecution of Internet activist Aaron Swartz is widely considered to be inconsistent with professional ethics. A White House web site petition to fire him for his handling of the case garnered more than 25,000 signatures in less than a month. One attorney for Swartz accused Heymann of using the case to gain publicity for himself. Two others submitted a complaint to the Department of Justice Office of Professional Responsibility, accusing Heymann of prosecutorial misconduct and alleging the prosecution withheld exculpatory evidence and undermined Swartz's right to a fair trial.

Swartz killed himself before his trial. According to attorney Andy Good, Swartz's initial attorney, "I told Heymann the kid was a suicide risk. His reaction was a standard reaction in that office, not unique to Steve. He said, 'Fine, we’ll lock him up.' I’m not saying they made Aaron kill himself. Aaron might have done this anyway. I’m saying they were aware of the risk, and they were heedless."

Ortiz has defended the prosecution: "We thought the case was reasonably handled and we would not have done things differently. We're going to continue doing the work of the office and of following our mission." Testifying before the House Oversight Committee, Attorney General Eric Holder called the case "a good use of prosecutorial discretion."

References

United States Attorneys for the District of Massachusetts
Living people
Year of birth missing (living people)
Place of birth missing (living people)